Kaniūkai might refer to these villages in Lithuania:

Kaniūkai, village in Šalčininkai district municipality, Vilnius County
Kaniūkai massacre, a massacre of Polish civilians in 1944
Kaniūkai (Jakėnai), village in Jakėnai eldership, Varėna district municipality, Alytus County
Kaniūkai (Kaniava), village in Kaniava eldership, Varėna  district municipality, Alytus County